1969 Emperor's Cup Final was the 49th final of the Emperor's Cup competition. The final was played at National Stadium in Tokyo on January 1, 1970. Toyo Industries won the championship.

Overview
Toyo Industries won their 3rd title, by defeating Rikkyo University 4–1.

Match details

See also
1969 Emperor's Cup

References

Emperor's Cup
Emperor's Cup Final
Emperor's Cup Final
Emperor's Cup Final
Sanfrecce Hiroshima matches